Renata Marcinkowska (born 24 February 1965) is a Polish-American former professional tennis player. She competed during her professional tennis career as Renata Baranski.

Biography
Born in Szczecin, Marcinkowska left Poland in 1981 to compete in the United States. Once there she received a scholarship to the Oklahoma State University, where she was an All-American collegiate tennis player. While at Oklahoma State she got married and became known as Renata Baranski. She graduated with a psychology degree in 1987, then joined the professional tour.

Her best performances on the WTA Tour include the semifinals at Guaruja in 1989 as well as the quarterfinals at both the 1989 OTB Open in Schenectady and the 1991 Virginia Slims of Oklahoma. As a doubles player she made a WTA Tour final at the 1991 Nivea Cup in São Paulo, where she and Laura Glitz finished as runners-up.

Marcinkowska played in the main draw of all four Grand Slam.

Becoming a naturalized U.S. citizen in 1991, Marcinkowska lives in South Carolina and works as a teaching professional. She trains players on a dual surface court she invented, which is one half hard and the other clay.

WTA Tour finals

Doubles (0–1)

ITF finals

Singles: (3–3)

Doubles: (3–3)

References

External links
 
 

1965 births
Living people
Polish female tennis players
American female tennis players
Polish emigrants to the United States
Oklahoma State Cowgirls tennis players
Sportspeople from Szczecin